Rob Harris is an American politician who is currently serving as a member of the South Carolina House of Representatives from the 36th district. Harris is a Republican.

Political career 

In the June 2022 Republican primary Harris defeated incumbent Rita Allison, who had held the office since 2008. He was unopposed in the 2022 general election.
He assumed office December 6, 2022.

Harris serves on the House Medical, Military, Municipal and Public Affairs Committee.

Harris authored the South Carolina Prenatal Equal Protection Act of 2023, which would make women who had abortions eligible for the death penalty. The bill attracted 21 Republican co-sponsors.

References

1965 births
Living people
Republican Party members of the South Carolina House of Representatives
Columbia Southern University alumni
2022 South Carolina elections